The Tars or  De Jantjes  is a 1934 Dutch comedy film drama directed by Jaap Speyer.

Cast

External links 
 

1934 films
Dutch black-and-white films
1934 comedy films
Films directed by Jaap Speyer
Dutch comedy films
1930s Dutch-language films